The Manichaean script is an abjad-based writing system rooted in the Semitic family of alphabets and associated with the spread of Manichaeism from southwest to central Asia and beyond, beginning in the 3rd century CE. It bears a sibling relationship to early forms of the Pahlavi script, both systems having developed from the Imperial Aramaic alphabet, in which the Achaemenid court rendered its particular, official dialect of the Aramaic language. Unlike Pahlavi, Manichaean script reveals influences from Sogdian script, which in turn descends from the Syriac branch of Aramaic. Manichaean script is so named because Manichaean texts attribute its design to Mani himself. Middle Persian is written with this alphabet.

The Iranologist Desmond Durkin-Meisterernst notes that the Manichaean script was mainly used to write numerous Middle Iranian languages (Manichaean Middle Persian, Parthian, Sogdian, Early New Persian, Bactrian), and Old Uyghur (a Turkic language). The Manichaean script is closely related to the Palmyrene script of Aramaic and the Estrangelo script of Syriac.

Nomenclature
The term "Manichean" was introduced as designation for the script by the German scholar Friedrich W. K. Müller, because of the use of the script in Manichean texts. Müller was the first scholar in modern times (in 1903/4) to read the script.

Overview
Older Manichaean texts appear in a script and language that is still identifiable as Syriac-Aramaic and these compositions are then classified as Syriac/Aramaic texts. Later texts using Manichaean script are attested in the literature of three Middle Iranian language ethnolects:
Sogdian — the dialect of Sogdia in the east, which had a large Manichean population.
Parthian — the dialect of Parthia in the northeast, which is indistinguishable from Medean of the northwest.
 Middle Persian — the dialect of Pars (Persis, or Persia proper) in southwest Iran.

The Manichaean system does not have a high incidence of Semitic language logograms and ideograms inherited from chancellery Imperial Aramaic that are an essential characteristic of the Pahlavi system. Besides that, Manichaean spelling was less conservative or historical and corresponded closer to contemporary pronunciation: e.g. a word such as āzād "noble, free" was written ʼčʼt in Pahlavi, but ʼʼzʼd in Manichaean Middle Persian of the same period.

Manichaean script was not the only script used to render Manichaean manuscripts. When writing in Sogdian, which was frequently the case, Manichaean scribes frequently used the Sogdian alphabet ("Uighur script"). Likewise, outside Manichaeism, the dialect of Parsa (Persia proper) was also recorded in other  systems, including Pahlavi scripts (in which case it is known as "Pahlevi" or Zoroastrian Middle Persian) and Avestan alphabet (in which case it is known as Pazend).

As Manichaeism was persecuted around Mesopotamia and the regions of the Sasanian Empire, its origins, it became well-established in Central Asia and along the Silk Road. It became an official state religion among the Uyghurs for five centuries (from the 8th through the 12th century), and thus many surviving manuscripts are found in the Turpan region in the Iranian languages aforementioned, the Old Uyghur language, and the Tocharian languages.

In the 19th century, German expeditions discovered a number of Manichaean manuscripts at Bulayiq on the Silk Road near Turpan in what is now Xinjiang. Many of these manuscripts are today preserved in Berlin.

Characters
Like most abjads, Manichaean is written from right to left and lacks vowels. Particularly, it has certain consonants that join on both sides, some that join only on the right, and some that only join on the left, and some that do not join at all, unlike the most well-known abjad, Arabic, which has only consonants that join on both sides or on the right. Manichaean has a separate sign for the conjunction "ud" (and); two dots are placed above characters to indicate abbreviations, and there are several punctuation-marks to indicate headlines, page-divisions, sentence-divisions, and others.

There are obligatory conjuncts for certain combinations involving "n" and "y." The numbers are built from units of 1, 5, 10, 20 and 100 and can be visually identifiable. There are also some alternate forms of certain characters.

Unicode

The Manichaean alphabet (U+10AC0–U+10AFF) was added to the Unicode Standard in June 2014 with the release of version 7.0.

References

Sources

Further reading
 
 
 Photos of the original texts written in manichaean script discovered at Turpan (Under the link "Texte in manichäischer Schrift")
 

Obsolete writing systems
Abjad writing systems
Manichaeism
Persian scripts
Right-to-left writing systems